Prizzi is a town and comune of 5,711 inhabitants in the Italian Metropolitan City of Palermo, on the island of Sicily. Prizzi is surrounded by the comuni of Campofelice di Fitalia, Castronovo di Sicilia, Lercara Friddi, Palazzo Adriano, Vicari, and the city of Corleone.

History
Traces have been found of a small Elymian settlement, called Hippana or Hyppana, dating from the 8th-6th centuries BC on the nearby Montagna dei Cavalli.  This settlement was later rebuilt in the 4th century BC, by Hiero I of Syracuse, and subsequently inhabited by Carthaginians, Greeks, Arabs, and Romans.  Hippana has the highest altitude Greek theater known in Sicily.  The ancient town of Comiciana was probably nearby. The town of Prizzi is thought to have been constructed by the refugees of a Roman invasion, but it is better documented to have at least pre-existed the Saracen invasion, when it was controlled by the Byzantines prior to the Arab conquest.  The name Prizzi derives from the Greek Pyrizo, meaning "incendiary" as in the context of sending smoke signals, referring to its origin as an important point for fighting off enemy invaders in Sicily.  The present town, of Norman origin, was a fief of Guglielmo Bonello.  In 1150, it passed to the Cistercian Monastery of Sant'Angelo.  Between the 13th and 15th centuries, control of the town was disputed by various lords until it finally fell to the Bonanno family, whose fief it was until 1812.

The town is known for its Easter celebration, U Ballu dei Diavoli, or, in Italian, Ballo dei Diavoli.

References
 https://web.archive.org/web/20100522181255/http://www.comune.prizzi.pa.it/paese/tradizioni/pagina_ballo%20diavoli.htm
 :it:Teatro di Hippana
 :it:Prizzi

External links
 www.gentracer.com/prizzi.html
 Agriturismo e Dintorni - Prizzi

Municipalities of the Metropolitan City of Palermo